Victor John Surridge (1892 Chipping Ongar, Essex, UK – 27 June 1911 Glen Helen, Isle of Man)  was an English motor-cycle racer who raced for the Rudge team.  After the works Rudge factory team visited the Isle of Man TT Races for the first time, Victor Surridge while practising for the 1911 Isle of Man TT Races was killed on the  Glen Helen section on the new Isle of Man TT Mountain Course used for the first-time in 1911.

From October 1910, Victor Surridge had ridden as a trade representative for Rudge motor-cycles and held an hour motor-cycle record at Brooklands and fastest-lap.  The accident to Victor Surridge occurred on the steep left-hand corner at Glen Helen and occurred when Victor Surridge attempted to pass another competitor, ran wide into a ditch and struck an earth-bank. An inquest decided that the death of Victor Surridge had probably been instantaneous and represented the first death of a competitor on the Isle of Man TT Mountain Course and the first death on the Island of a person in an automotive accident.

Sources

1892 births
1911 deaths
People from Chipping Ongar
English motorcycle racers
Isle of Man TT riders
Motorcycle racers who died while racing
Sport deaths in the Isle of Man